Velvet Hall railway station was a railway station which served the village of Horncliffe in Northumberland, England.

History

The station opened on 27 July 1849.

The station was host to a LNER camping coach from 1935 to 1939 and possibly one for some of 1934. The station closed for passengers on 4 July 1955 and completely on 29 March 1965.

Routes

Notes

References

External links
 Velvet Hall Station on navigable O.S. map

Disused railway stations in Northumberland
Former North Eastern Railway (UK) stations
Railway stations in Great Britain opened in 1849
Railway stations in Great Britain closed in 1955
1849 establishments in England